Callipepla is a genus of birds in the New World quail family, Odontophoridae. They are sometimes referred to as crested quails.

Species

References

External links

 
Bird genera

Taxonomy articles created by Polbot